Appleton may refer to:

People
Appleton (surname)

Places

Australia 
 Appleton Dock

Canada 
 Appleton, Newfoundland and Labrador
 Appleton, Ontario

United Kingdom 
 Appleton, a deserted medieval village site in the parish of Flitcham with Appleton, Norfolk, England
 Appleton, Oxfordshire, England
 Appleton Laboratory, Ditton Park, now Rutherford Appleton Laboratory, Harwell, England
 Appleton-le-Moors, Yorkshire, England
 Appleton Thorn, Warrington, Cheshire, England
 Appleton, Warrington, Cheshire, England
 Appleton, a northern area of Widnes, Cheshire, England
 Appleton railway station, a closed station in northern Widnes, England
 Appleton Wiske, North Yorkshire, England
 East Appleton, North Yorkshire, England

United States 
 Appleton, Arkansas
 Appleton, Illinois
 Appleton, Maine
 Appleton, Maryland
 Appleton Farms Grass Rides, Hamilton, Massachusetts
 Appleton Farms, Ipswich, Massachusetts
 Appleton, Minnesota
 Appleton, New York
 Appleton, Ohio
 Appleton, South Carolina
 Appleton, Tennessee
 Appleton, Washington
 Appleton, Wisconsin
 Old Appleton, Missouri
 Appleton City, Missouri
 Appleton Township (disambiguation) (several places)

Other uses
 Appleton (crater), a lunar crater
 Appleton (music duo), a musical duo comprising All Saints members Natalie and Nicole Appleton
 Appleton International Airport, outside Appleton, Wisconsin, United States
 Appleton spotlight, specialized moveable automobile spotlights (used especially for delivery or police vehicles)
 D. Appleton & Company, a former publisher of books and textbooks, based in New York and Boston
 Elizabeth Appleton, a 1963 novel by John O'Hara
 Appleton, Indiana, a fictional town from Jason Robert Brown's musical 13

See also
 Appletons' Cyclopædia of American Biography
 Appletun